Sevier is a surname. Notable people with the surname include:

 Ambrose Hundley Sevier (1801–1848), American politician from Arkansas
 Charlotte Sevier (1847–1930), British religious leader
 Corey Sevier (born 1984), Canadian actor
 Hal H. Sevier (1878–1940), American diplomat
 Henry Clay Sevier (1896–1974), American lawyer and politician from Louisiana
 John Sevier (1745–1815), American politician and frontiersman from Tennessee
 Kim Sevier (born 1968), American voice actress
 Valentine Sevier (1747–1800), American pioneer settler from Tennessee